The International Art Museum of America (IAMA), originally the Superb Art Museum of America, is an art museum located at 1023 Market Street between 6th and 7th Streets in the South of Market (SoMa) neighborhood of San Francisco, California. It was founded in 2011 by H. H. Dorje Chang Buddha III, an artist who claims to be a reincarnation of the Buddha Vajradhara,  and originally only contained works by him. In an interview with Huffington Post, Dyana Curreri-Ermatinger, the museum's director, denied that the museum was part of a cult, saying that its mission was "to provide a place that is  serene and peaceful in the otherwise chaotic environment of Central Market".

The front entrance contains a permanent garden installation with a pond, a waterfall, imitation rock formations, a pagoda-roofed gazebo, and a tree house sculpture designed by artist Steve Blanchard.

Collection  

Chinese artists included in the permanent collection
 Yongzheng Emperor (1678-1735)
 Fu Baoshi (1904-1965)   
 H.H. Dorje Chang Buddha III
 Huang Zhou (1925-1997)
 Qi Baishi (1864-1957)
 Wu Changshuo (1844-1927)
 Xu Beihong (1895-1953)
 Zhang Daqian (1899-1983)

European artists included in the permanent collection
 Rosa Bonheur (1822-1899) 
 Evariste Carpentier (1845-1922)
 David Martin (1737-1797)
 Charles Dorman Robinson (1847-1933)
 Sir Martin Archer Shee (1769-1850) 
 Frits Thaulow (1847-1906)
 Daniel Vertangen (1598-1684)
 Maurice de Vlaminck (1876-1958) 
 Dirick Wyntrack (1625-1678)

References

External links
 

2011 establishments in California
Art museums and galleries in San Francisco
Art museums established in 2011